Jarl Anders Lennart Borssén (14 March 1937 – 21 December 2012) was a Swedish actor and comedian.

Born in Berghem, Mark Municipality, Borssén had his first engagement in the Kar de Mumma revue at Folkan in 1966. He appeared in the TV series Partaj in 1969. In 1976 he went to Hagge Geigert's revue in Gothenburg where he stayed until 1979. Han gained more widespread popularity with his appearances in the TV program Gäster med gester in the 1980s.

Selected filmography
1995–98 – Svenska hjärtan (TV-series)
1986 – Jönssonligan dyker upp igen
1982 – Jönssonligan och Dynamit-Harry
1980 – Sverige åt svenskarna
1979 – Katitzi (TV-series)
1977 – 91:an och generalernas fnatt
1970 – The Lustful Vicar
1970 – Pippi in the South Seas
1970 – Som hon bäddar får han ligga
1969 – Pippi Longstocking (1969 TV series)

References

External links
 

2012 deaths
Swedish comedians
Swedish male actors
1937 births
People from Mark Municipality